Francis Park is an urban park located in the St. Louis Hills neighborhood of St. Louis, Missouri, United States. Francis Park is located between Eichelberger Street, Nottingham Avenue, Donovan Avenue and Tamm Avenue.

The park was named for David Rowland Francis (1850-1927), who had been the President of the Louisiana Purchase Exposition, governor of Missouri and mayor of St. Louis (1885-1889), who donated 60 acres of land for the park as a gift to the city of St. Louis on Christmas Eve in 1916. In 2018, a 7 foot bronze sculpture of Francis by artist Harry Weber was dedicated.

The park's amenities include handball, racquetball, and tennis courts; soccer and softball fields; and a playground.

The St. Louis Hills Neighborhood Association runs an art fair, 5k, and bike race as fundraisers for upkeep of the park.

See also 

 St. Louis Hills neighborhood
 Lindenwood Park neighborhood

References 

Parks in Missouri
Municipal parks in Missouri
Parks in St. Louis
Urban public parks
1916 establishments in Missouri